Aegaeon is a genus of shrimp in the family Crangonidae, with species living in waters from 6 to 1413 meters deep.

Species 
There are five species in Aegaeon:
 Aegaeon boschii Christoffersen, 1988
 Aegaeon cataphractus (Olivi, 1792)
 Aegaeon lacazei (Gourret, 1887)
 Aegaeon orientalis Henderson, 1893
 Aegaeon rathbuni de Man, 1918

References 

Decapod genera
Taxa named by Louis Agassiz
Crangonidae